Hoelscher is an English language surname derivative, primarily used in the United States. Its origins are from the North German "Hölscher", the occupational name for a maker of clogs (wooden shoes), which in turn comes from the Middle Low German "holsche" (prefix holt- meaning "wood"; suffix -scho meaning "shoe"; with the agent noun suffix "-er"). People with the name Hoelscher or its variants include:

 David Hoelscher (born 1975), American football defensive tackle
 Ulf Hoelscher (born 1943), German violinist
 Ludwig Hoelscher (1907–1996), German cellist

The name is strongly associated with Westphalia in Germany, although it is also associated with the Netherlands. Bearers of the name almost universally descend from individuals originally from the Paderborn region of Westphalia or the Netherlands. In Texas, "Hoelscher" is the surname of the largest family in that state, whose ancestors emigrated from the town of Olfen, Westphalia in the 1840s. Individuals of the family founded the towns of Olfen in Runnels County, Westphalia in Falls County, and Violet in Nueces County, Texas.

Variants 
 Christian Hölscher, Biochemist at the University of Ulster.
 Frank "Bud" Holscher, (Bud Holscher) (born 1931), American professional golfer of the 1950s and 1960s.
 Gary Holscher, American photographer located in the American Pacific Northwest.
 Kathleen A. Holscher, inaugural holder of the Endowed Chair in Roman Catholic Studies, professor in the Religious Studies Program, University of New Mexico
 Kenneth H. Holscher, Entomology professor at the University of Oklahoma.
 Knud Holscher (born 1930), Danish architect and industrial designer
 Louis M. Holscher, Professor of Mexican studies at the University of San Jose and the University of New Mexico.
 Ludger Hölscher, German theologian.
 Mark Holscher, American criminal defense attorney most famously associated with the defense of Wen Ho Lee.
 Nathan Holscher, American musician.
 Pat Holscher, American watercolor artist located in Washington, North Carolina.
 Patrick T. Holscher, American civil litigation attorney and author in Wyoming.
 Walter Holscher American cinematographer and film art director, perhaps best known for his work on The Wild One.

German-language surnames
North German surnames
Low German surnames

de:Hölscher